The Pan-European University (PEVŠ) is a private university based in Bratislava. Its founding in 2004 as the Bratislava University of Law was mainly due to its co-founder and co-owner Ján Čarnogurský. The school gradually expanded the number of faculties and since 2010 has changed its name to the Pan-European University.

Action and leadership 
PEVŠ operates as a university with a reputation as a dynamically developing institution of higher education with the ambition to become a center of modern education and research. The very motto "education without borders" of its time captured the essence of taking new paths in higher education and bringing practice-oriented education, in which academics from many countries will participate, while highlighting other aspects of the international dimension of education. PEVŠ has the rights of a doctoral degree (PhD.), It is authorized to conduct rigorous proceedings, as well as habilitation proceedings and appointment procedures of professors. The Pan-European University currently has more than 40 accredited study programs.

The rector since March 15, 2017 is prof. Juraj Stern [1] [2] His predecessor was two terms prof. JUDr. Ján Svák, Ph.D. [2]

Faculty 
At present, PEVŠ offers higher education at 5 faculties:

 Faculty of Law
 Faculty of Economics and Business
 Faculty of Psychology
 Faculty of Informatics
 Faculty of Mass Media

History

Teaching at the Bratislava University of Law began in 2004, when it was the first private university of law in Slovakia to admit the first students to its Faculty of Law. The Faculty of Economics and Business was opened in 2005, the Faculty of Mass Media was established in 2007 and the Faculty of Informatics in 2009. The youngest faculty of the school is the Faculty of Psychology, which was established in 2011. Since 2010 the school is called the Pan-European University, according to the concept pan-Europeanism, presented in 1923 by Nicolaus Coudenhove-Kalergi (1894 - 1972).

In January 2015, it was announced that the school would be taken over by a Czech holding company belonging to Miroslav Kurk. At the end of 2014, Ján Čarnogurský left the school, the school belonged to the Russians. She had financial problems in 2013. Time has passed since then and the school does not currently have any financial problems. [3] According to the available information, its development has significantly improved and it operates as the best private school currently in Slovakia. Graduates of this school are the best paid economists from among private schools.

 The Faculty of Law (2004) has a competitive advantage in comparison with other law faculties in Slovakia in terms of international and European law, the importance of which is constantly growing.
 The Faculty of Economics and Business (2005) prepares students for successful employment in the global economic environment. It is based on economic development trends in Slovakia and in the world. Study at the faculty is significantly influenced by international cooperation with well-known professors, associate professors and experts - economists from Slovakia, the Czech Republic, Austria, Germany, Russia and other countries.
 Faculty of Mass Media (2007) the school expanded its education in the field of mass media studies. The guarantee of modern education in attractive areas of mass media communication and journalism is a combination of important personalities - experienced teachers and theorists with elite experts from practice (journalists, managers of advertising and PR agencies, designers). Practical teaching of subjects takes place in the Media Center, which is one of the best equipped university centers for audiovisual, photography and radio production in Slovakia.
 The Faculty of Informatics (2009) is the only private faculty in Slovakia focusing on applied informatics and thanks to cooperation with major companies operating in the field of IT and connection to real business.
 The Faculty of Psychology (2011) is the first and only independent faculty of psychology in Slovakia. The study focuses on work and school psychology, but also on social and counseling. The faculty prepares students for the new European and global environment so that they are ready to apply in new conditions and be competent in terms of professional and linguistic.

International cooperation 
PEVŠ supports the constant exchange of knowledge, ideas, information, researchers, educators and students with the world. Since its inception, it has collaborated with prestigious foreign universities and scientific institutions. It is a member of 4 global university clusters, has Erasmus + partnerships and 60 other partner universities in EU countries and 24 other institutions outside Europe. In addition to domestic experts, a high percentage of foreign teachers also give lectures at the faculties, especially from the Czech Republic, Austria, Russia, the USA and Hong Kong.

References

External links

 

Education in Bratislava
Universities in Slovakia